Smallanthus uvedalia, known as hairy leafcup, bear's foot, and yellow flower leafcup, is a herbaceous perennial native to the Central and Eastern United States.  It is a member of the family Asteraceae.

Description
Hairy leafcup is 0.6 to 3.0 m (24 – 118 in) tall. The stem is stout and generally smooth below the inflorescence branches. The opposite leaves form a small cup around the stem and hence the name leafcup. Each head has 7 to 13 yellow, 1 – 2 cm (3/8 to 3/4 in) long ray flowers to the outside, and 40-80 or so yellow tube-like disc flowers to the inside. A single large plant may produce one hundred or so heads. The entire plant has a resinous odor.

The species was formerly named Polymnia uvedalia (Linnaeus) Linnaeus.

References

External links
 US Wildflower - Hairy Leafcup, Bear's Foot, Yellow Leafcup, Uvedalia - Smallanthus uvedalius

uvedalia